Events from the year 1584 in art.

Events
 Giacomo della Porta completes the façade of the Church of the Gesu in Rome.
 Dutch Golden Age painting begins.

Works

Annibale Carracci – The Beaneater (possible date)
Lavinia Fontana
Assumption of the Virgin with Saints Peter Chrysologus and Cassian
Portrait of the Coozzadini Family
Matteo Perez d'Aleccio – Saint Christopher carrying the Infant Saviour on his shoulder (fresco, Seville Cathedral)
Tintoretto – Capture of Zara from the Hungarians in 1346 amid a hurricane of missiles (Scuola Grande di San Rocco, Venice)

Births
February 2 - Anna Visscher, Dutch artist, poet, and translator (died 1651)
date unknown
Pietro Francesco Alberti, Italian painter and engraver for the late-Renaissance and early-Baroque periods (died 1638)
Giovanni Andrea Ansaldo, Italian painter active mainly in Genoa (died 1638)
Giacomo Apollonio, Italian painter of the late-Renaissance and early-Baroque periods (died 1654)
David Bailly, Leiden artist (died 1657)
Cesare Bassano,  Italian painter and engraver (died 1648)
Felice Damiani, Italian painter of religious themed works and altarpieces (died 1608)
Jean de Beaugrand, French lineographer and mathematician (died 1640)
Pieter de Valck, Dutch Golden Age painter (died 1625)
Cornelis de Vos, Flemish Baroque painter (died 1651)
Rafael Sadeler II, Flemish engraver of the Sadeler family (died 1627/1632)
Shōkadō Shōjō,  Japanese Edo period Buddhist monk, painter, calligrapher and master of the tea ceremony (died 1639)
Jan Tengnagel, Dutch painter (died 1631)
Jacob van der Laemen, Flemish painter (died 1624)
probable
Willem van der Vliet, Dutch painter and uncle of Hendrick Cornelisz. van Vliet (died 1642)

Deaths
January 4 - Tobias Stimmer, Swiss painter and illustrator (born 1539)
January 30 - Pieter Pourbus, Dutch-born Flemish Renaissance painter (born 1523)
May 22 - Ludger tom Ring the Younger, German painter and draughtsman (born 1522)
May 25 - Prospero Spani, Italian sculptor (born 1516)
August 29 - Lucas de Heere, Flemish portrait painter, poet and writer (born 1534)
date unknown
Pieter Balten - Flemish Renaissance painter (born 1525)
Jacques I Androuet du Cerceau, French architect, sculptor, designer (born 1510)
Giovanni Filippo Criscuolo, Italian painter (born c.1500)
Jacques du Broeucq, Dutch sculptor and architect (born c.1505)
Hu Zhengyan, Chinese artist, printmaker, calligrapher and publisher (died 1674)
Pierre Reymond, French enamelist (born 1513)
probable 
Pieter Huys, Flemish painter (born 1519)
Lambert Sustris, Dutch painter (born 1515/1520)

 
Years of the 16th century in art